Michelle Collins (born 1962) is an English actress and television presenter.

Michelle Collins may also refer to:

Michelle Collins (athlete) (born 1971), American sprinter
Michelle Collins (comedian) (born 1981), American comedian